Rock and Rollin' with Fats Domino is the 1956 debut album by rock and roll pianist and vocalist Fats Domino, compiling a number of his hits and other material, some of which would soon become hits. All included recordings have been released previously on Imperial Records singles from 1950 to 1956. The album, which featured a 
woodcut portrait of the musician, reached No. 17 on the Billboard "Pop Albums" chart. It is believed to have been produced by engineer Bunny Robyn due to the notation on the cover "A Robyn Recording".

Release history
The album was released on Imperial Records, catalog #LP-9004, in March 1956 and reissued by London Records under the title Carry on Rockin'''.

In spite of the term "rock and rollin'", the artist was not convinced that his work was of that genre. In 1956, he made this comment: "What they call rock and roll is rhythm and blues, and I've been playing it for 15 years in New Orleans."

When Domino left Imperial in 1963 to join Paramount, Imperial retained the rights to this and several other of Domino's notable albums, reissuing it on LP as recently as 1981. In particular, the album was reissued in 1969 as stereo (in fact "Electronically re-recorded to simulate stereo", as printed on cover) by Liberty Records, the new owner of Imperial Records, with catalog# LP-12387 and later in 1978 by United Artists Records, the new owner of Liberty Records, with catalog# UAS 29.097.

It has subsequently been reissued in conjunction with another early Domino album, Million Sellers by Fats, as Rock and Rollin' with Fats Domino/Million Sellers by Fats.

Songs
Although this was Domino's album debut, the R&B pianist had already been recording singles for seven years at the time of this release. The album compiled a number of Domino's hit singles as well as some songs that would soon become hit singles, including "Ain't It a Shame" (#1 ""Black Singles", #10 "Pop Singles"), "All by Myself" (#1 "Black Singles"), "Poor Me" (#1 "Black Singles"), "Bo Weevil" (#5 "Black Singles", #35 "Pop Singles") and "Don't Blame It On Me" (#9 "Black Singles"), but omitted "Don't You Know" (#7 "Black Singles"), "I Can't Go On" (#6 "Black Singles") and "Thinking of You" (#14, "Black Singles").

Track listingExcept where otherwise noted, all songs by Dave Bartholomew and Fats Domino.''
"The Fat Man" – 2:33
"Tired of Crying" (Domino) – 2:10
"Goin' Home" (Domino, Al Young) – 2:09
"You Said You Loved Me" – 2:32
"Going to the River" – 2:28
"Please Don't Leave Me" (Domino) – 2:30
"Rose Mary" – 2:10
"All by Myself" – 2:18
"Ain't It a Shame" – 2:23
"Poor Me" – 2:15
"Bo Weevil" – 2:01
"Don't Blame It on Me" – 2:38

Personnel
Fats Domino – piano, vocals
Bunny Robyn – presumed producer

Notes

References

External links

Fats Domino albums
1956 debut albums
Imperial Records albums